Rhead is a surname, and may refer to:

 Charlotte Rhead (1885–1947), English ceramics designer
 Frederick Alfred Rhead (1856–1933), English potter
 Frederick Hurten Rhead (1880–1942), ceramicist and figure in the Arts and Crafts movement
 Louis Rhead (1857–1926), English-born American artist, illustrator, author, and angler
 Matt Rhead (born 1984), English footballer

See also
 Rhead Story (1970–2013), politician from New Mexico
 Reade (name), given name and surname
 Read (surname)
 Reed (name)
 Reid (disambiguation)